Phragmataecia longivitta is a species of moth of the family Cossidae. It is found in Laos.

References

Moths described in 1926
Phragmataecia